In military terms, 116th Division or 116th Infantry Division may refer to:

 116th Division (People's Republic of China)
 116th Division (Imperial Japanese Army)
 116th Panzer Division (Wehrmacht)